Manning Commercial Historic District is a national historic district located at Manning, Clarendon County, South Carolina.  The district encompasses 46 contributing buildings and 1 contributing object in the central business district of Manning, county seat for Clarendon County.  Manning's downtown is dominated by its 1909 Neo-Classical, red brick courthouse set at the center of a landscaped courthouse square. The commercial district is characterized by one- and two-part commercial block buildings, many of them brick, that were constructed during the late-19th and early-20th century. The buildings are characterized by oblique and angled entrances, intriguing decorative cornices and corbeling, and a preponderance of parapeted rooflines give the Manning Commercial Historic District a clear and unmistakable association with the architecture typical of the early-20th century. In addition to the courthouse, other notable buildings include the U.S. Post Office and Federal Building, Coffey-Rigby Livery Stable, Clarendon Furniture Store, Leonard Building, Manning Hotel, Brailsford Grocery / Schwartz Building, Cut Rate Drug Store, and Pure Oil Service Station.

It was listed on the National Register of Historic Places in 2010.

References

Historic districts on the National Register of Historic Places in South Carolina
Neoclassical architecture in South Carolina
Buildings and structures in Clarendon County, South Carolina
National Register of Historic Places in Clarendon County, South Carolina